Aedes (Verrallina) butleri, sometimes as Verrallina butleri, is a species of zoophilic mosquito belonging to the genus Aedes. It is found in Sri Lanka Malaysia, Singapore, Java, Borneo, Philippines, Indochina, Thailand, and Maluku.

References

External links
A REVIEW OF THE SPECIES OF SUBGENUS GENUSAEDES, FROM SRI LANKA AND A XVI. VERRA LLINA , REVISED DESCRIPTION OF THE SUBGENUS (DIPTERA : c ULICIDAE) 
TEMPORAL CHANGES OF AEDES AND ARMIGERES POPULATIONS IN SUBURBAN AND FORESTED AREAS IN MALAYSIA.

butleri
Insects described in 1901